Hayden Randle Hurst (born August 24, 1993) is an American football tight end for the Carolina Panthers of the National Football League (NFL). He played college football at South Carolina and was drafted by the Baltimore Ravens in the first round of the 2018 NFL Draft.

Early years
Hurst attended The Bolles School in Jacksonville, Florida. He played football and baseball for the Bulldogs athletic teams. He graduated in 2012. Hurst was chosen by the Pittsburgh Pirates in the 17th round of the 2012 MLB draft and signed with the Pirates for a $400,000 signing bonus, turning down a baseball scholarship from Florida State. Hurst played two seasons in the Pirates organization before walking onto South Carolina's football team. In his only minor league pitching appearance, Hurst walked five batters and threw two wild pitches in one-third of an inning. Hurst gave up baseball because he was afflicted by "the yips."

College career
In 2015, as a true freshman, Hurst played in all 12 of South Carolina's games, catching eight passes for 106 yards.

In 2016, as a sophomore, Hurst played in all 13 games, catching at least one pass in each. He caught a career high seven passes against Kentucky. In total, Hurst caught 48 passes for 616 yards. He was awarded a scholarship the following spring.

In 2017, as a junior, Hurst once again played in all 13 games (including the 2018 Outback Bowl), catching 44 passes for 559 yards and two touchdowns. He was unanimously named to the 2017 All-SEC football team. Hurst declared for the 2018 NFL Draft on December 7, 2017, nearly a month before the 2018 Outback Bowl against Michigan. Hurst recorded three receptions for 41 yards in the 2018 Outback Bowl for a 26–19 South Carolina victory over Michigan.

Collegiate statistics

Professional career

Baltimore Ravens

2018

The Baltimore Ravens selected Hurst in the first round (25th overall) of the 2018 NFL Draft. He was the first tight end selected in the draft. On June 19, 2018, Hurst signed a four-year deal worth $11 million featuring a $6.1 million signing bonus. He recorded his first career touchdown reception, a 26-yard pass from fellow rookie Lamar Jackson, on October 28, 2018, late in the fourth quarter of a 21–36 loss to the Carolina Panthers. Overall, Hurst finished the 2018 season with 13 receptions for 163 receiving yards and one receiving touchdown.

2019
On September 15, 2019, in Week 2 against the Arizona Cardinals, Hurst caught a one-yard touchdown pass from Lamar Jackson, the second of his career, as the Ravens won 23–17. In Week 14 against the Buffalo Bills, Hurst caught three passes for 73 yards, including a career-long 61-yard touchdown pass from Jackson that helped the Ravens eventually win 24–17 and clinch a playoff berth. Overall, Hurst finished the 2019 season with 30 receptions for 349 receiving yards and two receiving touchdowns.

In the Divisional Round of the playoffs against the Tennessee Titans, Hurst caught four passes for 53 yards and a touchdown during the 12–28 loss.

Atlanta Falcons

On March 16, 2020, the Ravens agreed to trade Hurst to the Atlanta Falcons along with a fourth-round pick in the 2020 NFL Draft in return for 2020 second and fifth-round picks. The deal became official on March 18. In Week 2 against the Dallas Cowboys, Hurst caught five passes for 72 yards and his first touchdown reception as a member of the Falcons during the 39–40 loss.

The Falcons declined to exercise the fifth-year option on Hurst's contract on May 3, 2021, making him a free agent after the 2021 season.

On November 18, 2021, Hurst was placed on injured reserve with an ankle injury. He was activated on December 11, 2021.

Cincinnati Bengals
Hurst signed a one-year contract with the Cincinnati Bengals on March 18, 2022. He was named the Bengals starting tight end in 2022, recording 52 catches for 414 yards and two touchdowns through 13 starts.

Carolina Panthers
Hurst signed a one-year contract with the Carolina Panthers on March 15, 2023.

NFL career statistics

Regular season

Postseason

References

External links
Atlanta Falcons bio
Baltimore Ravens bio
South Carolina Gamecocks bio

1993 births
Living people
American football tight ends
Atlanta Falcons players
Baltimore Ravens players
Baseball players from Jacksonville, Florida
Gulf Coast Pirates players
Players of American football from Jacksonville, Florida
South Carolina Gamecocks football players
Cincinnati Bengals players